College Girl is a 1978 Hindi movie and a remake of Lipstick. Produced by Shantilal Soni, the film is directed by S. D. Narang. The film stars Sachin, Bindiya Goswami, Rita Bhaduri, Bhagwan, Paintal, and Shreeram Lagoo. 

The film's music is by Bappi Lahiri. There are 2 lovely songs in the movie - Kishore Kumar's "Pyar mangha hai tumhese na inkar karo" and "Nahin chahiye heere moti na dhan daulat ki shaan", a very rare devotional song by K.J. Yesudas and Chandrani Mukherji.
 
College Girl is a Romantic Crime Thriller Drama Film based on the life of Youth and their petty mistakes leading to the trouble of life. The Story revolves around two sisters. The elder sister trying hard to earn money for her middle-class family and the younger sister, the college girl, living carelessly and eventually is cheated and raped by her lover. She files a case against him but could not punish him, because she needs proof. Her elder sister, who is a lawyer, tries to collect the evidence, but is caught by the villain, and when he tries to rape her, the college girl who was seeking vengeance for destroying her future, shoots and punishes him in the climax of the movie. The role of the college girl is played by Rita Bhaduri and her sister by Bindiya Goswami. The playboy villain is Sudhir.

There are many adult visuals in the movie, though it is meant to be a family drama. Bindiya and Sachin are the hero and heroine, though there are more sequences for the comedian Paintal, with 3 songs for him sung by Kishore Kumar, Mohd. Rafi,  and Mahendra Kapoor. Sachin plays the hero, but this is not a substantial role in the film.

Cast 
 Sachin
 Bindiya Goswami
 Rita Bhaduri
 Bhagwan
 Paintal
 Shreeram Lagoo

Soundtrack
"Pyar Manga Hai Tumhee Se Naa Inkar Karo" - Kishore Kumar - A remake of this song, composed by Armaan Mallik and Neeti Mohan and interpreted by Zaeen Khan and Ali Fazal, has been published on YouTube in August 2016 and has over 157 Million views.
"Nahi Chahiye Rang Mahal" - Aarti Mukherjee, K. J. Yesudas
"Phoolo Ki Tarha Woh Hansti Thi" - Mohammed Rafi
"College Girl I Love You" - Kishore Kumar
"Everybody Dance With Me With Me" - Bappi Lahiri
"Please Dear Please" - Bappi Lahiri
"Jis Din Se Mai Bana Hu Dulha" - Mahendra Kapoor

References

External links 
 

1978 films
1970s Hindi-language films
Films scored by Bappi Lahiri